Pennsylvania Route 22 may refer to:

U.S. Route 22 in Pennsylvania
Pennsylvania Route 22 (1920s)